Cortinarius pholideus is a species of fungus native to Finland, Great Britain, and Norway. It can also be found in North America. It is considered inedible.

References

External links

pavelekii
Fungi of North America
Fungi described in 1838
Fungi of Finland
Inedible fungi